Richard Candido Coelho (born 18 February 1994), simply known as Richard, is a Brazilian professional footballer who plays as a defensive midfielder for Cruzeiro, on loan from Ceará.

Club career

Early career
Born in Campinas, São Paulo but raised in São Sebastião do Paraíso, Minas Gerais, Richard began his career with Monte Azul and finished his formation with Comercial-SP. He made his first team debut with the latter on 16 August 2013, coming on as a late substitute in a 2–2 away draw against XV de Piracicaba, for the year's Copa Paulista; it was his only appearance for the club.

After leaving Comercial, Richard represented Atlético Sorocaba and Atibaia, featuring sparingly for both sides.

Fluminense
On 17 August 2017, Richard was presented at Série A side Fluminense on loan, after a recommendation from the club's scouting area. He made his top tier debut on 17 September, starting in a 1–3 away loss against Atlético Paranaense.

On 8 February 2018, Richard signed a permanent four-year contract with Flu. He scored his first goal for the club on 15 April, netting the equalizer in a 1–2 loss at Corinthians.

Corinthians
On 10 December 2018, Richard moved to Corinthians on a four-year deal. Unable to establish himself as a regular starter, he was loaned to Vasco da Gama on 20 June 2019, until December.

Back to Timão for the 2020 campaign, Richard again featured rarely before moving to Athletico Paranaense on 20 July, on a 18-month loan deal for a €500,000 fee.

Career statistics

Honours
Corinthians
Campeonato Paulista: 2019

Athletico Paranaense
Copa Sudamericana: 2021

References

External links

1995 births
Living people
Sportspeople from Campinas
Brazilian footballers
Association football midfielders
Campeonato Brasileiro Série A players
Comercial Futebol Clube (Ribeirão Preto) players
Clube Atlético Sorocaba players
Sport Club Atibaia players
Fluminense FC players
Sport Club Corinthians Paulista players
CR Vasco da Gama players
Club Athletico Paranaense players
Ceará Sporting Club players
Cruzeiro Esporte Clube players